Tejpal Singh is an Indian politician and a member of the 16th Legislative Assembly of India. He represents the Chhata constituency of Uttar Pradesh and is a member of the Rashtriya Lok Dal political party.

Early life and education
Tejpal Singh was born in Mathura district. He attended Dr. Bhimrao Ambedkar University and attained Master of Arts degree.

Political career
Tejpal Singh has been a MLA for three terms. He represented the Chhata constituency and is a member of the Rashtriya Lok Dal political party.

Posts held

See also
 Chhata
 Sixteenth Legislative Assembly of Uttar Pradesh
 Uttar Pradesh Legislative Assembly

References

Rashtriya Lok Dal politicians
Uttar Pradesh MLAs 2002–2007
Uttar Pradesh MLAs 2012–2017
Uttar Pradesh MLAs 1993–1996
People from Mathura district
1949 births
Living people
Janata Dal politicians